Khamdang Gewog (Dzongkha: ཁམས་དྭངས་) is a gewog (village block) of Trashiyangtse District, Bhutan.

Overview

Khamdang Gewog consists of 18 villages with 617 households, covering an area of 44.5 square km with the population of 4320. The gewog is very dry mainly due to less forest coverage. Since it is in a dry zone, the most dominant land use categories in the gewog are dry land and Pangshing followed by the wetland and some Tseri cultivation. The major crops grown are maize, wheat, buckwheat and potato. While rice are grown on the lower areas and terraced fields developed in the 1970s.

History

The ruins with Khamdang villages depicts and reveals the fact about early inhabitants there. Near Shali in a small village called Denglum there is remains of ruins of Denglum Tshering Samdrup; a well known man during eighth century AD. The ruins of Khamdang Lekey Samdrup in main village of Khamdang; and the ruins of Wombu Karma samdrup used to be early inhabitants of Khamdang village. The notable history also lies in the old ruined fortress of Lhasey Tshangma at Tsenkharla Right near the present day Tsenkharla Middle Secondary School, school. Historically until the arrival of great Tibetan Buddhist masters; people inhabiting the area were practicing Bon faith like many parts of Bhutan did.

Demographics and ethnicity

The population of the gewog counts to 4320 with a density of 82 per km². The constituent people residing in Khamdang has varied originality. The Sharchokp speaking people in the middle and main Khamdang has their origins rooted to nearby Indian state of Arunachal Pradesh. The Kurtoep speaking people, constituting North-West Khamdang probably have been migrated during feudal era from Mongar/Zhongar. There constitute also a group of people speaking local dialects called Zalakha who were originally migrated from the Tawang, a small town in Indian state of Arunachal Pradesh.

Climate
While the Gewog confronts to all 4 seasonal change; the Northern part can be extremely cold during winter and have favorable climate during summer seasons. The Southern part can have a hot a humid climate during summer as in Manla; with temperature as high as 30 degrees Celsius with winter temperature ranging from 15 to 20 degrees Celsius.  The middle Khamdang experiences warmer summer and cooler winter. This variation in climatic conditions led people to cultivate in Southern part during winter; and Northern part during summer.

The main cash crops cultivated by the farmer are maize, chilies, potatoes, peanuts and other fruits like apple, walnut and pears. Rice cultivation is seen mainly at subsistence level. The still exists barter system within the farmer groups; exchanging rice and maize from lower altitude people to chilies from higher altitude people.

Developments
The Gewog has four community primary schools and one Middle Secondary School, Tsenkharla Middle Secondary School. Almost all the households have easy access to the schooling facilities. However, few households at Shakshing and Manla villages are within walking distance of one hour in one way due to typical nature of the location of the land. Students coming from these villages attend school as boarders at Tsenkharla Middle Secondary School.

It is the only gewog in the Dzongkhag connected by 9.1 km metalled feeder road. Further, the Dzongkhag road also passes through the geog. One BHU, and four ORC render basic health services in the gewog. Other development facilities in the gewog consist of RNR center and one forest beat office. Road access to the geog facilitates the marketing of farm produces at Doksum, Chorten Cora and Tashigang. There is not much possibility for increasing the cereals cultivation but the potential to grow citrus and other sub- tropical fruits and vegetables for cash income generation exists. About 80% of the Gewog is electrified.

Civic administration
The civic administration of Khamdang Gewog is the responsibility of the Khamdang Gup; who is directly accountable to the Dzongkhag Administration in Trashiyangtse. All the developmental plans comes from people to the Gup and then is forwarded to Dzongkhag Administration.

Religion and culture
Although Mahayana Buddhism is the state religion, almost all the people residing in the gewog are following Nyingma tradition of Tibetan Buddhism. Of various festivals performed in the gewog most notable is the annual event of Shakshing Tshechu. Khamdang Gewog has many Buddhist Religious Sites (Nye) with notable ones being Ombha Nye, Gungja Nye, Shakshing Goenpa, Darchen Goenpa and Nangkhar Goenpa
For well to do people, it is common to host a religious offerings and feasts. It is often seen the every household in such times will go to the hosts place with locally brewed wine and rice.

References

https://web.archive.org/web/20100224040957/http://www.trashiyangtse.gov.bt/gewogDetail.php?id=6
http://scs.rbp.gov.bt/ (archive)

Gewogs of Bhutan
Trashiyangtse District